Romanus (Latin for "Roman"), hellenized as Romanos (Ῥωμανός) was a Roman cognomen and may refer to:

People
Adrianus Romanus, Flemish mathematician (1561–1615)
Aquila Romanus, Latin grammarian
Giles of Rome, Aegidius Romanus, medieval philosopher
Gabriel Romanus (born 1939), Swedish politician
Pope John XIX, whose given name was Romanus
Pope Romanus
Richard Romanus (born 1945), American actor and writer
Romanus (bishop of Rochester)
Romanus (exarch), Exarch of Ravenna
The hypothetical Petrus Romanus, a figure mentioned in the Prophecy of the Popes
Sven Romanus (1906–2005), Swedish civil servant

Saints
Romanus of Nepi, Bishop and martyr of Nepi (1st century), feast day 24 August
Romanus Ostiarius, (died 	c. 258), feast day August 9
Romanus of Caesarea, Martyr (c. 303), feast day November 18
Romanus of Blaye (fl. 4th – 5th century), feast day November 24
Romanus of Condat, Abbot, Hermit (c. 460), feast day February 28
Romanus of Subiaco, Monk, (c. 550), feast day May 22
Romanos the Melodist, (c. 556), feast day October 1
Romanus of Rouen, Bishop, (c. 640), feast day October 23

Byzantine emperors
Romanos I Lekapenos, ruled 920–944
Romanos II, ruled 959–963
Romanos III Argyros, ruled 1028–1034
Romanos IV Diogenes, ruled 1068–1071

Places
Romanos, Aragon, a municipality in Aragon, Spain
Romanos, Ioannina, a village in the municipal unit of Lakka Souliou, Greece
Romanos, Messenia, a village in Messenia, Greece

See also
Roman (disambiguation)
Romana (disambiguation)
Romano (disambiguation)
Romanos (disambiguation)